Christopher Tamas (born January 27, 1981) is an American volleyball coach. He is the head coach of the Illinois Fighting Illini women's volleyball team, a position he had held since 2017. In 2018, he led the Fighting Illini to the NCAA Final Four.

Early life
Tamas graduated from the University of the Pacific in Stockton, California, earning his bachelor's degree in sports sciences/management in 2003.

Coaching career

UC Riverside
Tamas served as an assistant coach at UC Riverside from 2009 to 2011.

Minnesota
Tamas served as an assistant coach at Minnesota from 2011 to 2012.

Cal Poly
From 2013 to 2015, Tamas served as an assistant volleyball coach at Cal Poly.

Nebraska
On May 28, 2015, Tamas was hired by Nebraska to be an assistant volleyball coach under Hall of Fame head coach John Cook.

Illinois
Tamas was hired as Head Volleyball Coach by the University of Illinois on February 10, 2017, as the eighth head coach in Illinois history. Tamas led Illinois to the 2018 NCAA National semifinals. In the 2021 NCAA Tournament, Tamas led his team, who ranked 7th in the Big Ten conference, to an upset of national no. 7 seed and defending NCAA national champions Kentucky in the second round.

Head coaching record

Coaching tree
Assistant coaches under Tamas who became NCAA head coaches
 Rashinda Reed - Alabama 
 Alfee Reft - UCLA 
 Jason Mansfield - Kansas State

References

External links
 Illinois profile

Living people
1981 births
American volleyball coaches
Cal Poly Mustangs coaches
Illinois Fighting Illini women's volleyball coaches
Minnesota Golden Gophers women's volleyball coaches
Nebraska Cornhuskers women's volleyball coaches
UC Riverside Highlanders women's volleyball coaches
University of the Pacific (United States) alumni
Sportspeople from Santa Barbara, California